Calvert Green is a civil parish in Aylesbury Vale, Buckinghamshire, England.  It was created in 2003 from parts of Charndon and Steeple Claydon civil parishes. The new housing estate is built upon an old brickworks and the village hall, in the centre of the development, was erected above the old kilns.

References 

Civil parishes in Buckinghamshire